Uravugal is a 2009 Indian Tamil-language soap opera that aired on Sun TV. The show premiered on 1 June 2009. The show starring by Archana Krishnappa, Bhavana, Shreekumar, Rajkanth and Durga. The series also reunited  Bhavana, Shreekumar and Rajkanth, who previously starred together three years before on Megala (2007-2010). The show was directed by Balaji Yadav, Shiva K. and S. Haribabu. The show is produced by San Media Ltd and Vision Time India Pvt Ltd. The show last aired on 12 October 2012 and ended with 854 episodes. It also airs in Sri Lanka Tamil Channel on Vasantham TV.

Plot
Uravugal as the name suggests, is the story of the relationships between the members of one a joint family, who have a fallout after the death of the elder. Annamalai is the eldest of the family who is married to Parvathy. They have two children, Krishnan and Gowri. Annamalai has a younger brother Azhagesan who is married to Visalakshi / Visalam. They have two children, Ranjani and Mukunthan. Ranjani is married to Senthil Andavar, who is a useless fellow living off his in-law money. Krishnan did not study and has stopped at 10th level while Mukunthan is a MA graduate. All of them live as a happy joint family. 
The family decides on the wedding of the boys. Mukunthan's wedding was planned to be with and educated Gayathri, daughter of Thanikachalam and Rajeshwari. Krishnan's arranged with Chitra from a middle class family. Annamalai goes to Chitra's house with Mukunthan, and Mukunthan falls for Chitra's beauty. Amidst this, wedding for Mukunthan with Chitra and Krishnan with Gayathri is arranged. Krishnan had faked his education level to MA level for his brother's happiness. The marriage is over. Soon Gayathri realizes the truth and leaves Krishnan. Annamalai also dies of heart attack. His family is forced to be moved out by Mukunthan and his mother after being persuaded by Senthil. Gayathri soon realises her mistake and reunites with Krishnan. Both the family live separately. The differences between the brothers grow bigger and Mukunthan starts hating Krishnan. Small misunderstanding also occurs between Gayathri and Krishnan but everything get solved. The story moves on with bitter fights and arguments between the two families while Gayathri and Chitra try to solve them, though Chitra faces much trouble with a now changed Mukunthan.

Cast

Main cast

Supporting cast

Title song
It was written by Vairamuthu, composed by D. Imman. It was sung by Nithyasree Mahadevan. Other required music for the serial was provided by G. V. Kalaikathir, Rehan and Ramesh. The male version of the title song was composed by Ramesh

Soundtrack

Awards and nominations

References

External links
 Official Website 

Sun TV original programming
2009 Tamil-language television series debuts
2000s Tamil-language television series
Tamil-language television shows
2012 Tamil-language television series endings